Justin Phillip Reed is an American poet, novelist, and essayist, best known for his National Book Award-winning debut poetry collection Indecency.

Personal life 
Reed lives in St. Louis, Missouri. His work often deals with what it means to be a queer black man in America. He went to Washington University in St. Louis.

Books 
He published a chapbook, A History of Flamboyance, with YesYes Books in 2016.

Reed's first full-length book of poetry, Indecency, deals with black identity and sexuality. It was published by Coffee House in 2018. Francine J. Harris, Nina Simone, Deftones, and Khadijah Queen were among the people who inspired Reed to write the book. Indecency won the National Book Award in Poetry in 2018.

Bibliography

Books 
 A History of Flamboyance (2016)
 Indecency (2018)
 The Malevolent Volume (2020)

Selected poetry 
 BOAAT: "Every Cell in This Country…"
 Dreginald: "Quarantyne"
 Foundry: "When I Was a Man"
 Guernica: “The Hang-Up”
 Lambda Literary: "Minotaur"
 Nashville Review: "Beneficence"
 Paperbag: “The Telemachy” & 3 more
 PEN America: "The Bastard's Crown" & 1 more
 Poetry Foundation: “In a Daydream of Being the Big House Missus”
 Poets.org: "About the Bees"
 The Adroit Journal: "Exit Hex"
 The New York Times Magazine: "Theory for Expansion"
 The Offing: "When I Am the Reaper"
 The Shade Journal: "Head of Medusa"
 The Shallow Ends: "When What They Called Us Was Our Name"
 The Southeast Review: “Considering My Disallowance”
 Tupelo Quarterly: "South Carolina is / shaped like a heart […]"
 Vinyl: "|p|l|e|a|s|"
 wildness: "When I Had the Haint"
 Winter Tangerine Review: "Open Season"

Essays 
 Black Warrior Review: "Villainy"
 Catapult: "Killing Like They Do in the Movies"
 Catapult: "Melancholia, Death Motion, and the Makings of Marilyn Manson"
 The Rumpus: "The Double Agency of Will Smith in Sci-Fi"

Awards 
 National Book Award for Poetry for Indecency (Coffee House Press, 2018)
 Lambda Literary Award for Gay Poetry for Indecency (Coffee House Press, 2018)

References 

21st-century American novelists
21st-century African-American writers
21st-century American poets
American LGBT poets
Writers from St. Louis
National Book Award winners
Living people
Year of birth missing (living people)
African-American poets
LGBT African Americans
American male poets
African-American novelists
21st-century American male writers
African-American male writers
Washington University in St. Louis alumni